Röthelbach may refer to

Röthelbach (Traun), a river of Bavaria, Germany, tributary of the Traun
Röthelbach (Saalach), a river of Bavaria, Germany, tributary of the Saalach